is a railway station on the Tobu Skytree Line in Adachi, Tokyo, Japan, operated by the private railway operator Tobu Railway.

Lines

The station is close to Keisei Sekiya Station on the Keisei Main Line, so it is possible to transfer to Keisei Main Line.

Station layout

This station consists of two opposite side platforms serving two tracks.

Platforms

History
The station opened on 1 September 1932.

Surrounding area

 Keisei Sekiya Station (on the Keisei Main Line)

References

External links

 Tobu station information 

Railway stations in Japan opened in 1932
Railway stations in Tokyo